Wang Lili (born 8 September 1992) is a Chinese basketball player. She competed in the 2020 Summer Olympics.

References

1992 births
Living people
People from Jiamusi
Sportspeople from Beijing
Chinese women's basketball players
3x3 basketball players at the 2020 Summer Olympics
Olympic 3x3 basketball players of China
Chinese women's 3x3 basketball players
Medalists at the 2020 Summer Olympics
Olympic bronze medalists for China
Olympic medalists in 3x3 basketball
Asian Games medalists in basketball
21st-century Chinese women